Valentina Ferrer (born 19 September 1993) is an Argentinian model, actress, TV host, and beauty pageant contestant who was crowned Miss Argentina 2014 and represented her country at the Miss Universe 2014 pageant.

As a model, she is represented by agents in Buenos Aires, Mexico City, Miami, and Brazil. She has walked runways for Funkshion Fashion Week, Mercedes Benz Fashion Week, and Miami Fashion Week, sharing runways with Miss Universe 2013, Gabriela Isler, and Miss Universe 2008, Dayana Mendoza.

As an actress, she is known for Betty en NY (2019), J Balvin: Sigo Extrañándote (2017) and Intrusos en el Espectáculo (2001).

Miss Argentina 2014

Miss Argentina 2014 and the Miss Universe Competition
She was crowned Miss Argentina 2014 at the pageant held on October 10, 2014, as part of the International Tourism Fair in Hall Frers La Rural in Palermo, Buenos Aires. She represented Argentina in the Miss Universe 2014 pageant on January 25, 2014, in Doral, Florida, USA. In that pageant, she was placed in the Top 10, ending Argentina's eight-year drought of placements, and finished in the top five in the National Costume competition.

References

External links
 https://web.archive.org/web/20170116172402/http://valentinaferrer.com/
 
 
 

1993 births
Living people
Argentine beauty pageant winners
Miss Universe 2014 contestants
People from Córdoba, Argentina
Argentine female models
21st-century Argentine women